Marcus Masceranhas (born 16 April 1987) is an Indian footballer who currently plays for Sporting Clube de Goa in the Goa Professional League and won the competition in 2020–21 alongside emerging as the top goalscorer.

Career statistics

Club

Honours

Individual
Goa Professional League Golden Boot: 2018–19, 2019–20

References

External links
 Profile at Goal.com
 

Indian footballers
1987 births
Living people
Footballers from Goa
I-League players
Salgaocar FC players
Association football forwards
People from Margao
Goa Professional League players